Highland Park is a town in central Dallas County, Texas, United States. The population was 8,864 in 2020.

Highland Park is bordered on the south, east and west by Dallas and on the north by the city of University Park. Highland Park and University Park together comprise the Park Cities, an enclave of Dallas.

History

 The land now known as Highland Park was bought in 1889 by a group of investors from Philadelphia, Pennsylvania, known as the Philadelphia Place Land Association, for an average price of $377 an acre, with a total of $500,000. Henry Exall, an agent, intended to develop the land along Turtle Creek as "Philadelphia Place", exclusive housing based on parkland areas in Philadelphia. He laid gravel roads, and dammed Turtle Creek, forming Exall Lake, before the Panic of 1893 brought a blow to his fortunes, halting development. Afterwards, he began a horse breeding farm. In the 1890s, Exall Lake was a common picnic destination for Dallas residents.

In 1906, John S. Armstrong (the former partner of Thomas Marsalis, the developer of Oak Cliff), sold his meatpacking business and invested his money in a portion of the former Philadelphia Place land, to develop it under the name of "Highland Park". He chose this name as it was located on high land that overlooked downtown Dallas. Wilbur David Cook, the landscape designer who had planned Beverly Hills, California, and George E. Kessler, who had previously planned Fair Park and most of downtown Dallas, were hired to design its layout in 1907. Notably, twenty percent of the original land was set aside for parks. A second development in Highland Park was developed in 1910.

In 1913, Highland Park petitioned Dallas for annexation, but was refused. The 500 residents voted to incorporate on November 29, 1913, and incorporation was granted in 1915, when its population was 1,100. The first mayor of Highland Park was W. A. Fraser. A third and fourth development were added to the town in 1915 and 1917, respectively. In 1919, the city of Dallas sought to annex Highland Park, beginning a lengthy controversy that lasted until 1945. J. W. Bartholow and William Chloupek led the fight to resist the annexation. The final major land development occurred in 1924. In 1931, Highland Park Village was constructed, the first shopping center of its kind in the United States.

Because of its location near Dallas, Highland Park had, by the early 1930s, developed a moderately large (8,400) population, with a few businesses. Eventually the school districts and newspapers of Highland Park and University Park were combined. In the 1940s, after the failure to annex Highland Park, Dallas began annexing the land surrounding it. Reaching a population high of just under 13,000 in the late 1950s, Highland Park afterwards grew only by building houses on the remaining vacant lots, and by the destruction of old buildings. Since 1990, Highland Park has maintained strict zoning ordinances.

Geography

Neighborhoods

Highland Park was first developed as Old Highland which is made up of the First Section, Second Section, Turtle Creek Acreage, Acreage Section, Third Section, Fourth Section, and the Hackberry Creek Acreage of Old Highland Park. And then the Highland Park Neighborhoods West of Preston were developed.

Climate

The climate in this area is characterized by hot, humid summers and generally mild to cool winters.  According to the Köppen Climate Classification system, Highland Park has a humid subtropical climate, abbreviated "Cfa" on climate maps.

Demographics

According to the 2010 U.S. census, there were 8,564 people, 3,411 households, and 2,426 families residing in the town. At the 2020 United States census, there were 8,864 people, 3,398 households, and 2,562 families residing in the town.

Among the population in 2010, the racial and ethnic makeup was 94.4% White, 0.5% African American, 0.0% Native American, 2.8% Asian, 0.0% Pacific Islander, 1.0% from other races, and 1.1% from two or more races. Hispanic or Latinos of any race were 4.0% of the population. In 2020, the racial and ethnic makeup was 85.21% non-Hispanic white, 0.83% African American, 0.02% Native American or Alaska Native, 4.57% Asian American, 0.2% some other race or ethnicity, 3.91% multiracial, and 5.25% Hispanic or Latino American of any race.

Arts and culture
Highland Park Village shopping center is located in the municipality. The Highland Park Centennial Literary Festival is held in the community.

Parks and recreation
Dallas Country Club is located here.

Government

The Highland Park Town Hall houses municipal services. The Spanish Colonial architecture building was designed by architects Lang & Witchell.

Education

Primary and secondary schools

Public primary and secondary schools in Highland Park are operated by either the Highland Park Independent School District or the Dallas Independent School District.

Highland Park Independent School District
Most of the city (areas east of Roland Avenue) is served by the Highland Park Independent School District (HPISD). The HPISD portion is served by McCulloch Middle School and Highland Park Middle School, which share a campus located partially in Highland Park and partially in University Park.

Two elementary schools in Highland Park, Armstrong and Bradfield, serve sections of Highland Park.

Dallas Independent School District
A portion of Highland Park (areas west of Roland Avenue) is zoned to Dallas Independent School District. The area is within Trustee District 2 As of 2008 Jack Lowe represents the district. DISD schools that serve western Highland Park include Maple Lawn Elementary School, Rusk Middle School, and North Dallas High School.

Prior to fall 2006, Williams Elementary School, Marsh Middle School, and W. T. White High School served western Highland Park. After fall 2006 western Highland Park was rezoned to the schools that serve it as of 2008.

Media
The Dallas Morning News is the Dallas citywide newspaper.
BubbleLife provides online news, discussions and neighborhood Q&A.
Park Cities People is a local community newspaper.
The Good Life-Park Cities magazine is a free 4 color monthly neighborhood periodical that is mailed to all households in Highland Park
The Highland Park Public Library is adjacent to the Highland Park Town Hall. The library building and art gallery first opened in 1930. As time passed, the art gallery was repurposed as town council chambers and a portion of the library. In 2008 the library underwent major renovations.

In television
The television show Dallas used Highland Park as a filming location.

Infrastructure
The town council authorized the purchasing of a fire engine and the construction of a fire house after the 1913 incorporation. The town hall was built in 1924. During the same year, a new fire station opened next to town hall. The town hall has received several renovations. Connected the town hall is the public safety building. In 2003 a portion of the public safety building was razed, and a new facility was built in its place.

Highland Park employs a public safety department instead of separate police and fire/EMS departments.  The public safety officers are certified as firefighters, peace officers, and paramedics.  They work 24-hour shifts (with the next two days off), varying their role during the shift. EMS medical direction is provided by the BioTel system through UT-Southwestern Medical School, which provides this service to the majority of fire/EMS departments in Dallas County.

 Notable people 
 Bill Clements, 42nd and 44th Governor of Texas
 Armie Hammer, actor who starred in Call Me By Your Name lived in Highland Park as a child
 Angie Harmon, Rizzoli & Isles actress, was born in Highland Park
 Gino Hernandez, former American professional wrestler
 Jerry Jones, owner of the Dallas Cowboys of the National Football League
 Clayton Kershaw, pitcher for the Los Angeles Dodgers of Major League Baseball
 Bobby Layne, quarterback for the Detroit Lions of the National Football League
 Mariano Martinez, inventor, entrepreneur, restaurateur, and creative artist
 Peter O'Donnell, investor, philanthropist, Republican Party state chairman from 1962 to 1969, reared in Highland Park
 Matthew Stafford, quarterback for the Los Angeles Rams of the National Football League
 Marty Turco, Canadian Hockey player who played with the Dallas Stars for 9 seasons, lives in Highland Park
 Claire Underwood, fictional character from House of Cards (U.S. TV series) was raised in Highland Park
 Scottie Scheffler, PGA golfer, 2022 PGA Masters Champion

Notes

References

Further reading
 Ferguson, Cheryl Caldwell. Highland Park and River Oaks: The Origins of Garden Suburban Community Planning in Texas (University of Texas Press, 2014). xvi, 336 pp.; heavily illustrated.

External links

 
 Highland Park, TX at the Handbook of Texas''

Dallas–Fort Worth metroplex
Towns in Dallas County, Texas
Towns in Texas